The Worst Witch is a 1986 British musical fantasy television film based on the 1974 children's book of the same name by Jill Murphy.

Plot
The film follows the plot of the 1974 book. The story centres around Mildred Hubble, who is invariably the "Worst Witch" at Miss Cackle's Academy for Witches. Mildred causes many mishaps, including being late for school, making all of her classmates fall down, Mildred and her friend unintentionally turning themselves invisible, and transforming the class bully Ethel into a pig. The climax surrounds Miss Cackle's notorious evil twin sister, Agatha, plotting to take over the Academy. Ultimately Agatha is foiled by Mildred, and Mildred establishes herself as the hero for the academy.

Cast
 Fairuza Balk as Mildred Hubble
 Diana Rigg as Miss Hardbroom
 Charlotte Rae as Miss Cackle/Agatha
 Tim Curry as The Grand Wizard
 Sabina Franklyn as Miss Spellbinder
 Su Elliot as Delilah
Danielle Batchelor as Maud Warlock
Anna Kipling as Ethel Hallow
Kate Buckley as Donna
Leila Marr as Pixie Brown
Liz May Brice as Zoe Chant-Vestry
Katrina Heath as Sophie Hattrick
Tara Stevenson as Gloria Hobgoblin
Laura Heath as Misty Meadow
Sophie Cook as Natalie Sinister
Sophie Millett as Verity Sinister
Julia J. Nagle as Bubble Toil
Kathryn Lacey as Goodie Twocharm
Nevena Kaley as Dawn Undercover
Caroline Woolf as Julie Vanishing
Amy Shindler as Spinner Webb
 Pui Fan Lee as Prefect

Production
The film was shot at St. Michael's College in Tenbury Wells.

Soundtrack
Its opening and closing song "Growing Up Isn't Easy" was performed by Bonnie Langford and was composed by Charles Strouse with lyrics by Don Black. The pair also wrote "Anything Can Happen on Halloween". Denis King composed the movie’s score and wrote the song "My Little School".

References

External links

The Worst Witch
1986 films
1986 television films
British fantasy films
British films about Halloween
British television films
Films about witchcraft
Films about wizards
Films based on British novels
Films directed by Robert Young
Films scored by Charles Strouse
Halloween television specials
1980s British films